Journal für die Frau was a German biweekly women's magazine that existed between 1978 and 2005.

History and profile
The magazine was established in 1978 with the name Journal für Haushalt und Familie. The first issue of the magazine appeared on 30 August 1978 and was published on a monthly basis.

In October 1980 it was renamed Journal für die Frau. The frequency of the magazine was switched to biweekly on 19 October 1983. Its headquarters was in Hamburg. The market share of Journal für die Frau was 15,5% in 2000 in terms of subscription. In 2001 the website of the magazine was launched. Target audience of Journal für die Frau was women aged 40-49. Stefan Lewerenz was one of the editors-in-chief of the magazine. In the second quarter of 2003 Journal für die Frau sold 306,312 copies.

The owner of the magazine was Axel Springer Verlag until first quarter of 2005 when Burda Verlag, a media company based in Munich, acquired it. The last issue of Journal für die Frau was published in January 2005. The new owner of the magazine, Burda, merged it with another women's magazine Freundin.

References

External links

1978 establishments in West Germany
2005 disestablishments in Germany
Biweekly magazines published in Germany
Defunct magazines published in Germany
German-language magazines
Magazines established in 1978
Magazines disestablished in 2005
Magazines published in Hamburg
Women's magazines published in Germany